Tamaqua Historic District is a national historic district located at Schuylkill Township and Tamaqua, Schuylkill County, Pennsylvania.  The district includes 944 contributing buildings, 3 contributing sites, 8 contributing structures, and 3 contributing objects in the central business district and surrounding residential areas of Tamaqua.  The residential buildings principally date to the early 20th century.  They are mostly two-story, of brick and frame construction, and in a variety of popular architectural styles including Queen Anne, Late Victorian, Italianate, and Colonial Revival. Notable non-residential buildings include the Little Schuylkill Hotel (1827), White Swan (c. 1845), Washington House (c. 1842-1850), Shepp Building, Elks Lodge, Peoples Trust Company Building (c. 1915), Tamaqua National Bank (1908), First National Bank of Tamaqua (1905, 1919), U.S. Post Office (1932), Majestic Theater and Hotel, Hegarty Blacksmith Shop (1848), Conrad Biscoff Planing Mill and Furniture Factory (1865), Tamaqua Manufacturing Company (1910), Calvary Episcopal Church (1851), First Methodist Church (1852), St. Jerome's Roman Catholic Church (1856), American Hose Company (1881), East End Fire Co. (1923), and the former Tamaqua Armory. The contributing sites are St. Jerome's Cemetery (c. 1837), Odd Fellows Cemetery (1865), and the foundation of the Fitzpatrick Shirt Factory (1888). Contributing structures include three runs of iron steps and five bridges. Located in the district and separately listed are the Anthracite Bank Building, George Ormrod House, and Tamaqua Railroad Station.

It was added to the National Register of Historic Places in 2001.

References

Historic districts on the National Register of Historic Places in Pennsylvania
Second Empire architecture in Pennsylvania
Queen Anne architecture in Pennsylvania
Buildings and structures in Schuylkill County, Pennsylvania
National Register of Historic Places in Schuylkill County, Pennsylvania